Csökmő is a large village in Hajdú-Bihar county, in the Northern Great Plain region of eastern Hungary.

Geography

Population

References

External links

 Official site in Hungarian

Populated places in Hajdú-Bihar County